David Keith Cobb  is an American political activist who was the Green Party presidential candidate for the 2004 election. Cobb later became the campaign manager for fellow Green Jill Stein for her presidential run in 2016.

2004 presidential campaign

With the announcement in late December 2003 that Nader would not seek the Green Party nomination for president in 2004, Cobb became a front-runner for the nomination.  On January 13, 2004, David Cobb won the first Green primary in the nation, that of the District of Columbia, beating local activist Sheila Bilyeu and several write-in candidates and gaining an early lead in the nomination scramble.

Nader eventually announced an independent campaign for president and sought the endorsement of the Green Party and other minor parties; his supporters continued to push for a Nader victory in the various Green Party primary elections in states across the country.  Shortly before, the Green Party presidential nominating convention, held in Milwaukee, Wisconsin, in June 2004, Nader selected Green Party member Peter Camejo as his running mate.  On June 26, on the second ballot, the convention selected Cobb as the Green presidential candidate – a process rocked by controversy as Nader had won the vast majority of actual Green Party votes in nearly all state primary elections (Cobb received only 12.2 percent support). The party also nominated Pat LaMarche as its candidate for vice-president.

Cobb stated his intention to run a campaign focused on building the Green Party and pursuing a "strategic states" or "smart states" strategy which would take into account the wishes of Greens in each state, and which otherwise would focus on states that traditionally are "safely" won by the Democratic candidate, or "safely" won by the Republican candidate, with a large margin of victory. Such so-called "safe states" are also referred to in campaign literature as "neglected states" because the Democratic and Republican candidates traditionally put most of their campaign energy into more competitive "swing states." Cobb's campaign said that each state's campaign would aim to follow the wishes expressed by local Greens. While some of Cobb's supporters urged swing state residents to vote for Democrat John Kerry in order to stop the re-election of President George W. Bush, other Cobb supporters encouraged votes for Cobb and LaMarche everywhere. The candidates themselves used the phrase "vote your conscience," campaigning both in swing states such as Wisconsin and safe states such as California.

On October 8, 2004, Cobb was arrested in an act of civil disobedience, breaking a police line while protesting the Commission on Presidential Debates for excluding third-party candidates from the nationally televised debates in St. Louis, Missouri. Also arrested was Libertarian candidate Michael Badnarik.

In the November 2004 presidential election, Cobb placed sixth in the popular vote total nationwide, earning over 119,859 votes (0.10 percent), but received no electoral votes. This represented a decline of over 90 percent support compared to the votes garnered by Nader.

Post-election activities
Since running for president, Cobb has become a member of the Board of Directors for the Green Institute, and of the Sierra Club's national Corporate Accountability Committee, a Fellow with the Liberty Tree Foundation for the Democratic Revolution, on the Steering Committee of Democracy Unlimited of Humboldt County, along with being the group's campaigns director, and is a Principal with Program on Corporations, Law, and Democracy (POCLAD).

Cobb facilitated the founding convention of the Green Party of Louisiana during a two-day convention which took place on August 31 and September 1, 2002, in New Orleans.

Cobb co-founded Cooperation Humboldt.

Cobb was the campaign manager for Green candidate Jill Stein in the 2016 U.S. presidential election.

Election history

See also

 2004 United States election voting controversies
 2004 United States presidential election

References

External links

Democracy Unlimited of Humboldt County website
2004 nomination acceptance speech 2004 Green Party Convention
2008 Green Party convention speech
David Cobb discussing third parties Protests outside of 2004 DNC

1962 births
2004 United States election voting controversies
21st-century American politicians
American anti–nuclear power activists
American democracy activists
American environmentalists
California Greens
Consumer rights activists
Green Party of the United States presidential nominees
Living people
People from Galveston County, Texas
People from Eureka, California
Texas Greens
Candidates in the 2004 United States presidential election
University of Houston alumni
Activists from California
Activists from Texas